Southlake Moor is a 196.1 hectare (484.6 acre) biological Site of Special Scientific Interest near Burrow Mump and Burrowbridge in Somerset, notified in 1985.

Southlake Moor forms part of the extensive grazing marsh and ditch system of Somerset Levels and Moors. Southlake Moor is unusual in that, when conditions in the River Parrett are suitable, it may be deliberately flooded in winter by means of a sluice in the river floodbank. Some 96 species of aquatic and bankside vascular plant species have been recorded from Southlake Moor, of particular interest is the greater water-parsnip (Sium latifolium). When the moor is flooded, large numbers of wildfowl may be present; with up to 22,000 wigeon (Anas penelope), 250 Bewick's swan (Cygnus bewickii) and good numbers of pochard (Aythya ferina), teal (Anas crecca) and tufted duck (Aythya fuligula). Regular signs of the otter (Lutra lutra) are to be seen on the muddy banks of the River Parrett. The ditches on the east side of the site contain a population of the palmate newt (Triturus helveticus).

During 2009 and 2010 work was undertaken to upgrade sluice gates, watercourses and culverts to enable seasonal flooding during the winter diverting water from the Sowy River onto the moor. It has the capacity to hold 1.2 million cubic metres as part of a scheme by the Parrett Internal Drainage Board to restore ten floodplains in Somerset. In spring the water is drained away to enable the land to be used as pasture during the summer. The scheme is also used to encourage water birds.

References 

Sites of Special Scientific Interest in Somerset
Sites of Special Scientific Interest notified in 1985
Somerset Levels
Wetland Sites of Special Scientific Interest